Burch Creek is a river in Herkimer County in the state of New York. It flows into the Mohawk River east of West Schuyler.

Water quality
Streambank erosion on Burch Creek contributes sediment loads into the Erie Canal. Periodic dredging to restore adequate canal navigational depth causes further siltation and affects fish habitat..

References

Rivers of Herkimer County, New York
Mohawk River
Rivers of New York (state)